Sebastian Prieto (born 4 February 1987, Monaco) is a British handball player. At the 2012 Summer Olympics he competed with the Great Britain men's national handball team in the men's tournament.

Early life
Born to a French mother and an English father, Prieto was raised in Monaco where he initially played football at junior level for AS Monaco before taking up handball at the age of 15.

Career
In May 2006, Prieto moved to Denmark to play handball full time, after reading about the Olympic project online. He later played for German club TUSEM Essen along with several other members of the British Handball squad.

References

Living people
1987 births
Handball players at the 2012 Summer Olympics
Olympic handball players of Great Britain
British male handball players